Zexi Li (born ) is a Canadian government data analyst who lives in Ottawa and who was the lead complainant of the Freedom Convoy class action lawsuit.

Early life and education 
Li was born in Fuzhou, China, and moved with her parents from to Canada at the age of two. Her family initially moved to Scarborough before her parents divorced, one moving to downtown Toronto, the other to Montreal.

Li attended the University of Ottawa, where she initially studied commerce and accounting, later changing to business technology management.

Adult life 
Since graduation, Li has worked as a data analyst for Shared Services Canada, and previously worked as a concierge in two residential high rise buildings in Ottawa.

During the Canada convoy protest in 2022, Li lived in a high rise building in the centre of Ottawa. She subsequently became the lead complainant the Freedom Convoy class action lawsuit that was served on Canada convoy protestors.

In March 2022, Li was given the City Builder award by the Mayor of Ottawa, Jim Watson.

On 14 October 2022, Li testified at the Public Order Emergency Commission, and spoke of how the noise of the protest interrupted the sleep and lives of Ottawa's residents, and the harassment she encountered from protestors. Li has been the target of harassment in response to news coverage about her.

Li was 21 years old in 2022.

See also 

 Timeline of the Canada convoy protest

References 

Living people
2000s births
Canadian civil servants
University of Ottawa alumni
Activists from Ontario
People from Ottawa
Canadian women activists
Chinese emigrants to Canada
Canada convoy protest
People from Fuzhou